Louis Hillier (1868–1960) was a Belgian musician and composer of Wallonia, who in 1901 wrote the music of the Le Chant des Wallons, the Walloon anthem.

Among his many other compositions, he was commissioned by The General Electric Company, Ltd. (GEC of the UK, not GE of the USA) to write a company March which was performed at their 1904 Annual Dinner. It incorporated a musical part written for electric bells, still new technology at the time.

External links

The GEC March
 Illustrated Sheet Music and Data
 Cent Wallons

Walloon people
Belgian composers
Male composers
Belgian musicians
1850 births
1910 deaths
19th-century Belgian musicians
19th-century composers
20th-century Belgian musicians
20th-century composers
19th-century Belgian male musicians
20th-century Belgian male musicians